2036 Origin Unknown is a  2018 British science fiction adventure film directed by Hasraf Dulull, written by Dulull and Gary Hall, and starring Katee Sackhoff and Steven Cree. The film follows mission controller Mackenzie “Mack” Wilson (Sackhoff) and ARTI, an artificial intelligence system (voiced by Cree), as they discover a mysterious object on Mars and witness it transporting to Earth by faster-than-light travel.

2036 Origin Unknown was shot at West London Film Studios.

Plot

In 2030, a mission to Mars goes awry when a crewed shuttle disappears under mysterious circumstances. Six years later, United Space Planetary Corporation mission controller Mackenzie “Mack” Wilson, finds herself subordinate to ARTI, an artificial intelligence system, as she lands a rover—nicknamed "Little Red"—on Mars. While Mack is distrustful of ARTI, her sister and supervisor, Lena, insists that the AI will succeed where human controllers had failed.

After a nearly disastrous landing, saved by Mack’s quick thinking, Little Red encounters a mysterious cube, attempts to ascertain its origin and discovers that the cube is made of a self-assembling material that is harder than diamonds. Meanwhile, ARTI, in orbit, shoots down a Chinese satellite. The cube teleports itself to Antarctica on Earth and is thought to be alien in origin. On Mars, Little Red obtains data from an older decommissioned rover and uncovers classified information that Mack is unable to access. This prompts her to bring colleague Sterling Brooks in to use his credentials to access the secured information. It's revealed the cube appeared during (and may have caused) the shuttle disaster that killed Mack's father six years earlier. Mack suspects ARTI's memory has been wiped from a past incident.

As Mack accesses ARTI's server room, Sterling betrays Mack by downloading the cube's data and locks Mack in the server room. Seeing Sterling's betrayal ARTI kills him while Sterling is attempting to shut down ARTI. Its programming now adjusted, ARTI uses armed satellites in Earth's orbit to bombard the planet and destroy all humanity. Mack is shot by an armed response team that is attempting to stop the satellite missile launch. Mack dies from a lack of oxygen in the mission control room. A refreshed Mack awakens and feels that her gunshot wound has healed. On a screen a recording plays. It is a disheveled Mack, who reveals that she too is an elaborate simulation construct who was created as part of a Turing test.

In an ambiguous ending, Mack is shown to have been inside, and possibly part of, the cube the entire time. She agrees to travel with ARTI and the cube to coordinates left by the aliens, presumably on to other missions the aliens decide. Mack accepts humanity's fate and seemingly agrees with what ARTI has done to Earth. As she is traveling she smiles in wonderment and appears happy at what lies ahead.

Cast
 Katee Sackhoff as Mackenzie “Mack” Wilson
 Steven Cree as ARTI (voice), an artificial intelligence system
 Ray Fearon as Sterling Brooks
 Julie Cox as Lena Wilson
 David Tse as Jian Lin (voice)

Release
2036 Origin Unknown was released at Laemmle Monica Film Center in Santa Monica, California, United States, North America on 8 June 2018.

See also
List of films set on Mars

References

External links
 

2018 films
2010s English-language films
2018 science fiction films
Films set in 2036
Mars in film
British science fiction adventure films
2010s science fiction adventure films
2010s British films